Norman L. Nielsen was a member of the Utah House of Representatives.  He was also the head of the Scera Center for the Arts in Orem, Utah for several years beginning in the later 1970s.  He revitalized the Scera and made it a major artistic venue in Orem.

Nielsen graduated with a B.S. degree from Brigham Young University in 1963.

Sources
BYU Magazine Spring 2009

Brigham Young University alumni
Members of the Utah House of Representatives
Politicians from Orem, Utah
Possibly living people
Year of birth missing